A seven-part referendum was held in Ecuador on 28 August 1994. Voters were asked whether they approved of allowing independents to run in elections, whether the National Assembly should manage the state budget, whether to distribute the state budget by government department or region, whether to allow unlimited re-election for politicians, whether to elect members of the National Assembly in one or two rounds of voting, whether to allow dual citizenship, and whether the National Assembly should approve constitutional reforms within 100 days.

Results

Allowing the election of independents

Allowing the National Assembly to control the state budget

Distributing the state budget

Unlimited terms of office

Electoral system for the National Assembly

Allowing dual citizenship

Constitutional reforms to be approved by the National Assembly within 100 days

References

Referendums in Ecuador
1994 in Ecuador
1994 referendums
Electoral reform referendums
Electoral reform in Ecuador